Armin Dassler (15 March 1929 – 10 October 1990) was the son of Rudolf Dassler, German founder of the sportswear company Puma and nephew of Adidas founder, Adolf "Adi" Dassler.

Under his father's direction, Puma remained a small provincial company. Only under the direction of Armin Dassler did it become the worldwide known company it remains today.

References

1929 births
1990 deaths
Armin
People from Herzogenaurach
Businesspeople from Bavaria
German billionaires
Shoe designers
20th-century German businesspeople